The Roman Catholic Diocese of Kolwezi is a diocese located in the city of Kolwezi  in the Ecclesiastical province of Lubumbashi in the Democratic Republic of the Congo.

History
 March 11, 1971: Established as Diocese of Kolwezi from the Diocese of Kamina

Leadership
 Bishops of Kolwezi (Latin Rite), in reverse chronological order
 Bishop Richard Kazadi Kamba (since 2022.01.11)
 Bishop Nestor Ngoy Katahwa (2000.11.16 – 2022.01.11)
 Bishop Floribert Songasonga Mwitwa (1974.04.25 – 1998.05.22), appointed Archbishop of Lubumbashi
 Bishop Victor Petrus Keuppens, O.F.M. (1971.03.11 – 1974.04.25)

See also
Roman Catholicism in the Democratic Republic of the Congo

Sources
 GCatholic.org
 Catholic Hierarchy

Kolwezi
Roman Catholic dioceses in the Democratic Republic of the Congo
Christian organizations established in 1971
Roman Catholic dioceses and prelatures established in the 20th century
Roman Catholic Ecclesiastical Province of Lubumbashi
Roman Catholic bishops of Kolwezi